The following is a list of presidents of CONCACAF. CONCACAF is the continental governing body for association football in North America, Central America and the Caribbean

Presidents of CONCACAF

See also
List of presidents of FIFA
List of presidents of AFC
List of presidents of CAF
List of presidents of UEFA
List of presidents of CONMEBOL
List of presidents of OFC

References

 
Presidents of CONCACAF
CONCACAF